Antun Herceg (Serbian Cyrillic: Антун Херцег; born November 9, 1927) is a former Serbian footballer.

Club career
He started playing for lower league FK Sloga Novi Sad, that would latter be renamed back to FK Vojvodina, where he played until 1951, when he, as a talented youngster, signed with Belgrade giants FK Partizan. He played there a total of eight seasons, until 1958, having played 313 matches and scored 101 goals, of which 138 were league matches and 38 league goals. He also won 3 Yugoslav Cup with Partizan (1952, 1954, 1957).

International career
Beside the four matches and two goals scored for the Yugoslavia B team, between 1954 and 1956, he played 12 matches and scored twice for the Yugoslavia national football team. His debut was on September 3, 1950 in a friendly match against Sweden played in Stockholm where, playing as a left-winger, scored the decisive goal that gave another win to Yugoslavia (2-1 win). His fairway match was played in Athens on May 5, 1957, against Greece, having ended with a goalless draw in which he was decisive having played as left-back in a defensive line formed together with Vladimir Beara and Tomislav Crnković.

Personal life
After leaving Partizan, he continued playing for some time in West Germany, where after retiring, continued living there as a dentist.

External links
 

Living people
1927 births
People from Inđija
Yugoslav footballers
Yugoslavia international footballers
Serbian footballers
Serbian people of Croatian descent
FK Vojvodina players
FK Partizan players
Yugoslav First League players
Association football midfielders
Association football defenders
Yugoslav emigrants to West Germany